A mushroom is the fruiting body of a fungus.

Mushroom(s) or The Mushroom may also refer to:

Companies
 Mushroom Group, an Australian music and entertainment company
 Mushroom Pictures, a film production and distribution subsidiary
 Mushroom Records, a record label subsidiary
 Mushroom Networks, an American telecommunications networking company
 Mushroom Records (Canada), a record label
 Mushroom Studios, a music studio in Vancouver, British Columbia, Canada
 Mushroom TV, a defunct British television company

Film and television
 The Mushroom (1970 film), French film
 The Mushroom (1997 film), Egyptian film
 Mushrooms (film) or Chatrak, 2011 Indian Bengali film
 "Mushrooms" (Law & Order), television episode

Music
 Mushroom (band), an American musicians' collective in the San Francisco Bay area
 Andrew Vowles, or Mushroom, British musician, founding member of Massive Attack
 Mushroom (album) or the title song, by Eatmewhileimhot, 2012
 "Mushroom" (song), by Can, 1971

Places
 Mushroom (lava flow), a lava flow in Yukon, Canada
 Mushroom Island, Antarctica
 Mushroom Lake, an alpine lake in Custer County, Idaho, US
 Mushroom Peak, a mountain in Alberta, Canada
 The Mushroom, a rock formation in Timna Valley, Israel

Other uses
 Mushroom (Mario), a type of power-up in Super Mario video games
 Mushroom gene, a gene that affects pigment in horses
 The deformation of various expanding bullets
 Mushroom cloud

See also